Meslan is a commune in the Morbihan department of Brittany in north-western France. Inhabitants of Meslan are called in French Meslannais.*

Population

Geography

Historically it belongs to Vannetais and Pays Pourlet. Apart from the village centre, there are about eighty hamlets. Most of them consist in two or three houses but others are more important like Bonigeard. The river Ellé forms the western border of the commune.

Neighboring communes

Map

List of places

History

The parish church, placed under the patronage of Saint Mélaine, was rebuilt in 1577. The oldest surviving parish registers date back to 1678. The first mayor of Meslan, Louis Trouboul, was murdered by a gang of chouans on the night of January 9 to 10, 1795.

Monuments

See also
Communes of the Morbihan department
List of the works of the Maître de Lanrivain

References

External links

Official site 

 Mayors of Morbihan Association 

Communes of Morbihan